The 2021–22 Kansas State Wildcats men's basketball team represented Kansas State University in the 2021–22 NCAA Division I men's basketball season, their 119th basketball season. The Wildcats were led by 10th-year head coach Bruce Weber and played their home games in Bramlage Coliseum in Manhattan, Kansas as members of the Big 12 Conference. They finished the season 14–17, 6–12 in Big 12 play to finish ninth place. They lost to West Virginia in the first round of the Big 12 tournament. 

On March 10, 2022, head coach Bruce Weber announced he was stepping down as head coach after 3 straight losing seasons during the Covid era. On March 21, the school named longtime Baylor assistant Jerome Tang the team's new head coach.

Previous season
In a season limited due to the ongoing COVID-19 pandemic, the Wildcats finished the 2020–21 season 9–20, 4–14 in Big 12 play to finish in ninth place. They defeated TCU in the first round of the Big 12 tournament before losing to Baylor in the quarterfinals.

Offseason

Departures

Incoming transfers

Recruiting classes

2021 recruiting class

2022 recruiting class

Roster

Schedule and results

|-
!colspan=12 style=| Exhibition

|-
!colspan=12 style=|Regular Season

|-
!colspan=12 style=| Big 12 tournament

Source:

See also 
 2021–22 Kansas State Wildcats women's basketball team

References

Kansas State Wildcats men's basketball seasons
Kansas State
2021 in sports in Kansas
Kansas